The Don River Bridge is a reinforced concrete road bridge that carries the Leichhardt Highway across the Don River, located near Rannes, Queensland, Australia. The former low-level timber bridge was prone to flooding.

Three new concrete bridges are planned on a new and improved alignment of a  section of the Leichhardt Highway over the Don River, Windmill Creek and Log Creek as part of the A$65 million Don River Bridges Project. When completed the higher bridges will improve flood immunity of this rural highway.

Construction of the new bridges is expected to start by the end of 2011 and be completed in mid-2013.

See also 
 Don River Bridge, Bowen

References

External links
 Don River Bridge on the Department of Transport and Main Roads webpage

Road bridges in Queensland
2013 establishments in Australia
Wooden bridges in Australia
Concrete bridges in Australia
Bridges completed in 2013